Mountain holly is a common name for several plants and may refer to:

Olearia macrodonta, native to New Zealand
Ilex montana, native to eastern North America
Ilex mucronata, native to eastern North America